The 2016 OFC Futsal Championship was the 11th edition of the OFC Futsal Championship, the annual international futsal championship organised by the Oceania Football Confederation (OFC) for the men's national teams of Oceania. The tournament was held in Suva, Fiji between 8–13 February 2016.

The tournament was originally to be held in Papeete, Tahiti, but was moved to Fiji after Tahiti withdrew. The 2015 tournament, which was originally scheduled to be held in Tahiti between 1–8 August 2015, was not played.

Same as previous editions held on the same year as the FIFA Futsal World Cup, the tournament acted as the OFC qualifiers for the World Cup. The winner of the tournament qualified for the 2016 FIFA Futsal World Cup in Colombia as the OFC representative.

Solomon Islands were crowned as champions for the fifth time on 13 February 2016, sealing their qualification to the World Cup.

Teams
A total of six OFC member national teams entered the tournament.

Venues
The matches were played at the Vodafone Arena in Suva.

Matches
The tournament was played in round-robin format. There were three matches on each matchday. The draw for the fixtures was held on 16 December 2015 at the OFC Headquarters in Auckland, New Zealand.

All times were local, FJT (UTC+12).

Winners

Solomon Islands qualified for the FIFA Futsal World Cup for the third consecutive time.

1 Bold indicates champion for that year. Italic indicates host for that year.

Awards
The following awards were given at the conclusion of the tournament.

References

External links
2016 OFC Futsal Championship, oceaniafootball.com

2016
2016 FIFA Futsal World Cup qualification
2016 in futsal
Futsal
2016
2016 in Fijian sport